The 2023 Belmont Abbey Crusaders men's volleyball team represents Belmont Abbey College in the 2023 NCAA Division I & II men's volleyball season. The Crusaders, led by second year head coach Derek Sullivan, were picked to finish fourth the Conference Carolinas title in the coaches preseason poll.

Season highlights
Will be filled in as the season progresses.

Roster
{| class="toccolours" style="border-collapse:collapse; font-size:90%;"
|-
| colspan="7" style=background:#D41042;color:#FFFFFF; border: 2px solid #FFC72C; | 
|-
|-
|width="03"| 
|valign="top"|
Defensive Specialist/Libero
3 Daniel Cerqua - Senior
14 Christian Rodriguez - Sophomore
23 Ben Anderson- Freshman 

Middle Blockers
2 Jibriel Elhaddad - Freshman6 Nolan Schmidt Sophomore 
7 Jay Beller - Freshman18 Ethan Rehmann - Sophomore|width="15"| 
| valign="top" |
Outside Hitters
4 Gage Giller - Senior5 Evan Ford - Freshman9 Matthew Staskunas - Sophomore10 Zach Puentes- Freshman15 Matteo Miselli - Senior 
24 Ryan Charles - Sophomore 
26 Alex Winiarczyk - Sophomore 

|width="15"| 
| valign="top" |
Opposite Hitters
1 Ayden Anderson - Freshman10 Zach Puentes- Freshman 
16 Brian Knoerr- Sophomore 

Setters
11 Jack Walsh - Sophomore12 Clayton Zimmerman - Junior19 Matthew Maxwell - Senior23 Zach Cramer - Sophomore|width="20"| 
|}

Schedule
TV/Internet Streaming information:
All home games will be streamed on Conference Carolinas DN. Most road games will also be televised or streamed by the schools television or streaming service.

 *-Indicates conference match.
 Times listed are Eastern Time Zone.

Announcers for televised games
LIU: Brian RushingCharleston (WV): Jack Withrow''
Hawai'i: 
Erskine: 
Mount Olive: 
Barton 
North Greenville: 
King: 
Fort Valley State: 
Emmanuel: 
Queens: 
Erskine: 
Limestone: 
Morehouse: 
Fort Valley State: 
King: 
Fairleigh Dickinson: 
Lees-McRae: 
Limestone: 
Barton: 
Mount Olive: 
Queens:
Emmanuel: 
Lees-McRae: 
North Greenville:

References

2023 in sports in North Carolina
2023 NCAA Division I & II men's volleyball season
Belmont Abbey